Arrabalera is a 1951 Mexican comedy drama film directed by Joaquín Pardavé and starring Marga López, Fernando Fernández and Freddy Fernández.

The film's art direction was by Jorge Fernández.

Partial cast
 Marga López as Rosita Villaseñor  
 Fernando Fernández as Roberto  
 Freddy Fernández as Pichi  
 Manolo Fábregas as Felipe  
 Manolita Saval as Ana María  
 Armando Velasco as Don Juanito Dueñas 
 Joaquín Cordero as Luis  
 Quintín Bulnes as Belindo  
 Aurora Walker as Doña Lupe  
 Pascual García Peña 
 Eufrosina García as Doña Epifania  
 Trio Los Panchitos as Cantantes  
 Roberto G. Rivera as Cantante  
 Manuel Hernández as Cantante 
 Eva Garza as Cantante  
 Trio Martino as Grupo musical

References

Bibliography 
 Deborah R. Vargas. Dissonant Divas in Chicana Music: The Limits of la Onda. University of Minnesota Press, 2012.

External links 
 

1951 films
1951 comedy-drama films
Mexican comedy-drama films
1950s Spanish-language films
Films directed by Joaquín Pardavé
Mexican black-and-white films
1950s Mexican films